Cary Wendell Wallin (born April 4, 1974) is a retired American female volleyball player.  She was part of the United States women's national volleyball team.

She won with the American team the silver medal at the 1994 Goodwill Games. She played for the Stanford Cardinal, the University team of the Stanford University. She is part of the Stanford Cardinal Hall of Fame.

Awards
  Stanford Cardinal Hall of Fame

References

External links
 
 http://articles.latimes.com/1992-12-18/sports/sp-2238_1_ucla-women-s-volleyball
 http://pac-12.com/article/2010/12/05/spotlight-stanfords-cary-wendell
 http://stanforddailyarchive.com/cgi-bin/stanford?a=d&d=stanford19951101-01.2.37&e=-------en-20--1--txt-txIN-------

1974 births
Living people
American women's volleyball players
Stanford Cardinal women's volleyball players
Place of birth missing (living people)
Competitors at the 1994 Goodwill Games